The following is a list of Yazidi settlements in Iraq, Syria, Turkey, and Armenia, including both current and historical Yazidi settlements. Historically, Yazidis lived primarily in Iraq, Turkey, and Syria. However, events since the end of the 20th century have resulted in considerable demographic shifts in these areas as well as mass emigration. Today, the majority of the Yazidis live in Iraq and are particularly concentrated in the Nineveh Plains and Sinjar areas in the Nineveh Governorate in northern Iraq.

Iraq
The following settlements in Iraq are currently inhabited by Yazidis:

Duhok Governorate
Duhok District

Duhok

Simele District

Chigan
Dayrabun
Faysh Khabur
Girepan (Gerepane, Gir Pahn, Girebun, Grepan)
Gutba
Kabartu (Kebertu, Kibrtu)
Khanke (Khanek, Khanik, Xanke)
Kharshina (Kharshani, Kharshnya, Khirschnia, Khurshinah, Xershenya)
Klebadir (Galebader, Kelebadre, Qalat Bardi, Qaleba'drê)
Mam Shivan (Mem Shivan, Mam Shuwan, Mamshivan, Mamshuwan)
Qesr Êzdîn
Rubaidiya (Rubaydiyah)
Sharya (Shaira, Shaire, Shariya)
Sheikh Xadr (Schekh Khadir, Shayk Adarah, Shekh Khdir, Shexedra)
Simele (Simel, Semel, Semil, Sumail, Sumel)
Sina (Sîna, Sena, Sini)
Surka
Zayniyat

Zakho District

Zakho

Nineveh Governorate
Al-Hamdaniya District

Bahzani (Behzani, Bahzan, Behzan, Behzane)
Bashiqa (Bashiqe, Bashika, Bashiqah)

Mosul District

Mosul
Kanisan

Shekhan District

Baadre (Baadra, Ba‘adra, Baadhre, Badra, Badre, Baedra, Bathra)
Beristek (Bêristek, Berstak)
Esiyan (Esian, Êsiya)
Eyn Sifni (Ain Sifni, Ayn Sifni, Sheikhan)
Gabara (Kabara)
Jarwana
Kendali (Kandala, Qandal)
Mahad
Mahmudah
Mam Rashan
Musakan (Mûsekan)

Sinjar District

Adika (Adikah)
Alidina (Aldina, Aldinah)
Bakhalif (Bakhulayf)
Bara (Barah)
Barana
Borek
Chilmera
Dohula
Dugure
Gabara (Qabara)
Gir Zerk (Girezarka, Kuri Zarqah)
Gohbal
Gunde
Halayqi (Halayqiya, Halayqiyya)
Hardan
Jaddala (Jidala, Jaddalah, Jidale)
Jafri (Chafari, Jafariya, Jafriyan, Jafriyya)
Kahtaniya
Karsi (Karse)
Khana Sor (Khanasor, Khana Sur, Khanesor)
Kocho
Kulakan (Kulkan)
Mamise (Mamisi)
Markan (Mahirkan, Merkan, Mihirkan, Mirkhan)
Maynuniyya (Majnuniya, Majnuniyya, Majnuniyah)
Milik (Malik)
Nakhse Awaj (Nahisat Awj)
Qiniyeh
Quwesa (Quwasi)
Rubaidiya
Sakiniyya (Sakiniya, Sukainiya, Sukayniyah, Sikeniye)
Samuqa (Zamukhah)
Shamika
Siba
Siba Sheikh Khidir
Sinjar
Jazeera
Jazirah Sinuni (Sinone, Sinune)
Tal Banat
Tal Qasab
Taraf (Taraf Jundik, Teraf)
Wardi (Wardiya, Wardiyya, Wardiyah) 
Yusafan (Yusufan)
Zerwan (Zarwan, Zeravan, Zirawan)
Zorava (Zorafa, Zarafah)

Tel Kaif District

Babirah
Bozan
Beban
Daka (Dakan, Dekan)
Dughata (Doghati, Doghan)
Jawhariyah (Jarahi, Jarahiya, Jarhiyah)
Kersaf (Kar Saf)
Khatarah (Khetara, Hatara)
Khorzan (Khursan)
Khoshaba
Shêkhka
Sreshka (Sireski, Sireshkan)
Taftyan (Taftian, Tiftijan)
Tel Keppe

Turkey

Historical and current Yazidi settlements in Turkey

Syria

Armenia

The majority of Yazidi villages are located in western Armenia, in Aragatsotn Province, Armavir Province, and Kotayk Province.

Below are towns and villages in Armenia with Yazidi population (majority and minority) organized by province, as listed in Omarkhali (2017: 35):

Aragatsotn Province

Northeastern Aragatsotn
Sipan
Avshen
Ortachia
Alagyaz
Dzhamushlu
Rya Taza
Mirak
Shenkani
Sangyar

North-central Aragatsotn
Aragats
Shenavan
Zovuni

Southeastern Aragatsotn
Ashtarak
Proshyan
Ilanchalan
Sagmosavan
Nazyrvan
Bazmakhpyur
Ghazaravan

West-central Aragatsotn
Avtona
Dian
Baysyz
Aynali
Shamiram
Kalakut
Verkhniy Kalakut

Southwestern Aragatsotn
Talin
Pirmalak
Areg
Kabakhtapa
Arteni
Gyalto
Sabunchi
Sorik
Akko (Hako)
Getap

Kotayk Province
Dzhrarat
Dzhraber
Nor Gekhi
Elar (now Abovyan)
Nor Gyugh
Zar
Dzhrvezh
Arindzh

Ararat Province
Masis
Mehmandar
Getashen (Getazat)
Artashat
Bagramyan
Verin Kurdkend (now Norashen)
Ararat
Zovuni
Geghanist

Armavir Province

Karaburun
Lukashin
Bambakashat
Amasiya
Berkashat
Pshatavan
Arevik
Igdalu
Arazap
Badal (now Yeghegnut)
Margara
Nizhniy Karkhun
Araks
Apaga
Arshaluys
Samaghar
Shahumyan
Argavand
Ayarlu
Oshakan
Aygeshat

See also 
List of Yazidi holy places
Genocide of Yazidis by ISIL
Sinjar massacre
Sinjar Alliance

References
Notes

Citations

Bibliography

 

 
Iraq-related lists
Geography of Kurdistan
Syria-related lists
Turkey-related lists